Medonosy is a municipality and village in Mělník District in the Central Bohemian Region of the Czech Republic. It has about 100 inhabitants. The village of Nové Osinalice within the municipality has well preserved examples of folk architecture is protected by law as a village monument reservation.

Administrative parts
Villages and hamlets of Chudolazy, Nové Osinalice, Osinalice and Osinaličky are administrative parts of Medonosy.

History
The first written mention of Medonosy is from 1352.

Gallery

References

External links

Villages in Mělník District